Jaswan-Pragpur Assembly constituency is one of the 68 constituencies in the Himachal Pradesh Legislative Assembly of Himachal Pradesh a northern state of India. Jaswan and Pragpur is also part of Hamirpur, Himachal Pradesh Lok Sabha constituency.

Member of Legislative Assembly

Election candidate

2022

Election results

2017

See also
 Jaswan
 Pragpur
 Kangra district
 List of constituencies of Himachal Pradesh Legislative Assembly

References

External links
 

Assembly constituencies of Himachal Pradesh
Kangra district